Beatrijs (English: Beatrice) is a poem written in last quarter of 14th century (ca.1374), possibly by Diederic van Assenede, and is an original Dutch poem about the legend of a nun, Beatrijs, who deserted her convent for the love of a man, lives with him for seven years and has two children. When their money is low he deserts her and she becomes a prostitute to support her children for another seven years. One day she is near her old convent, so she inquires discreetly what has become of the nun Beatrijs, and learns that people think Beatrijs is still at the convent. One night a voice urges her to return to the convent, and when she returns, Beatrijs learns that Mary (mother of Jesus) has been acting in her role at the convent, and she can return without anyone knowing of her absence.

The Dutch poem was created out of a legend recorded in Latin, Dialogus Miraculorum (1219-1223) and Libri Octo Miraculorum (1225-1227) written by Caesarius von Heisterbach. Although Hilka claims that Caesarius von Heisterbach was not the true author of the latter text, as Duinhoven points out, he was certainly the author of record during the Middle Ages. The subject matter is possibly of Dutch origin during his travels in the Netherlands. However the Dutch version was not a word-for-word translation. The tale is translated into English, Esperanto, Frisian, French, German, Spanish, Old Norse and Arabic.

Adaptations
In the 20th century several modern adaptations have been produced:

 Poem: Beatrijs by Dutch poet P.C. Boutens
 Play: Ik dien (Dutch for I serve) by Herman Teirlinck
 Opera libretto: Beatrijs by Felix Rutten

See also
 Dutch folklore

Notes

References
Duinhoven, A.M. De geschiedenis van Beatrijs. Utrecht: HES, 1989.
Die Wundergeschichten des Caesarius von Heisterbach." Ed. An Alfons Hilka. Gesellschaft für rheinische Geschichtskunde, Publikationen 43, 1933.
Meijer, Reinder. Literature of the Low Countries: A Short History of Dutch Literature in the Netherlands and Belgium. New York: Twayne Publishers, Inc., 1971, page 20-21.

External links
 Beatrijs at the Digital Library for Dutch Literature (in Dutch)

14th-century poems
Dutch legends
Fictional Christian nuns
Fictional Dutch people
Middle Dutch literature